Ennamma Kannu is a 2000 Indian Tamil-language drama film, directed by Sakthi Chidambaram, starring Sathyaraj, Devayani, Ranjith and Vadivelu. The film's musical score was by Deva and was released in 2000. The name of the film was inspired by the song of the same name from Mr. Bharath, which also starred Sathyaraj. The film was remade in Telugu as Ramma Chilakamma in 2001.

Plot
Kasi is a womanizer leading a carefree life with his friend Chellappa. Kasi meets Gayathri and mistakes her as a call girl but later realizes her true identity. This creates a bad impression in Gayathri for Kasi. Barath Kalyan is a rich man who falls in love with Gayathri and proposes to marry her. But Gayathri loves Kasi's friend Vishwa. Vishwa is employed with a rich businessman. Gayathri's brother wants her to marry Barath Kalyan but she does not agree and leaves the home with the hope of marrying Vishwa.

Vishwa and Gayathri decide to get married in a register office. Kasi also accompanies them. But Vishwa gets a phone call from his boss and leaves immediately. Vishwa requests to postpone the wedding plan as he has to travel immediately to the US for some work related engagements. Kasi takes Gayathri to his home as she has no one to help. Kasi behaves in a gentle manner with Gayathri and a mutual respect develops between them. Vishwa does not contact Gayathri for a few days and this worries Kasi.

It is revealed that Vishwa has plans to ditch Gayathri and marry his boss’ daughter with thoughts of becoming rich. Kasi and Gayathri reach the wedding hall to cancel Vishwa's wedding. But Vishwa degrades Gayathri accusing her having an illegitimate relationship with Kasi. Gayathri is angered and decides to break up with Vishwa. She also makes her mind to marry Kasi but Kasi refuses saying that this would make look as if the allegations made by Vishwa are true and requests her to marry Barath Kalyan who still truly loves her. Barath Kalyan and Gayathri are united.

Cast
Sathyaraj as Kaasi
Devayani as Gayathri
Vadivelu as SP Telex Pandian IPS and'Setup' Chellappa (Dual Roles)
Kovai Sarala as Simran
Ranjith as Vishwa
Jyothi Lakshmi
Devan
Pandu
Thalaivasal Vijay
Besant Ravi

Soundtrack

Music was composed by Deva and released on Anak Audio.

Reception
The film received mixed to positive reviews from critics.

Savitha Padmanabhan of The Hindu wrote, "The performances throughout are convincing. This is a role written for Satyaraj and he is very good at what he does. Devyani too takes her role seriously and has put in a lot of effort. But Ranjith has nothing much to do. Vadivelu makes his presence known, and that too in a double role, but he is a bit irritating at times. The song sequences are eminently avoidable except perhaps the songs where the matinee idol MGR makes a brief appearance, thanks to graphics. There is nothing to write home about the music by Deva, while B. Kannan's camera work is functional. Except for these drawbacks, "Ennamma Kannu" is quite entertaining and enjoyable."
Balaji Balasubramaniam of thiraipadam.com wrote, "The dialogues are sharp at many points and help move the story forward in spite of the familiar situations. Vadivelu also raises some chuckles with a double role (a policeman and a pimp) with lots of in-jokes about cops in other movies. The mix-up scenes are quite funny though not related to the story. The other strength of the movie is Satyaraj. After a really long time, he gets a role he can really sink his teeth into and relishes it. Devayani looks pale throughout but fits the bill as far as the role is concerned. Ranjith is adequate and Sarala gets to again indulge in her favorite activity of thrashing Vadivelu."
Lolluexpress.com wrote, "Satyaraj did a OK job in this movie considering his previous movies in which he was irritating. It was nice to see Satyaraj in action. Ranjit was totally irritating. The movie runs with Satyaraj's usual lollu. Another Vadivelu Called "Telex Pandian" gets introduced as a Police officer and Sarala gets introduced as Vadivelu's wife. It was really funny when Vadivelu calls 'Kovai' Sarala as "Simran". Its worth only 40/100 that too for Satyaraj and Vadivelu's comedy."
Chennaionline.com wrote, "The director has kept his narration fairly interesting most of the time and the film moves at a fast pace. The Vadivelu comedy is at times hilarious. The late MGR dances here too with Devayani and Satyaraj, thanks to computer technology."
New Straits Times wrote "Though the movie is almost obscene in the beginning, the story becomes stronger as it proceeds into the second half and manages to maintain our attention".

References

External links

2000 films
Films scored by Deva (composer)
2000s Tamil-language films
Tamil films remade in other languages
Films directed by Sakthi Chidambaram